Al-Mansura was a Palestinian Arab village in the Tiberias Subdistrict. It was depopulated during the 1947–1948 Civil War in Mandatory Palestine on May 10, 1948. It was located 16 kilometres northwest of Tiberias.

History
It had a population of 16 households, all Muslim. The villagers paid a fixed  tax-rate of 25% on agricultural products, including wheat, barley, rice,  goats and beehives, in addition to occasional revenues;  the taxes totalled 530  akçe.

In 1838, el-Mansura was noted as a  Druse village in the Esh-Shagur district, located between Safad, Acca and Tiberias.

In 1875  Victor Guérin found the village to have 200 Druse inhabitants. In 1881,  the PEF's Survey of Western Palestine described El Mansurah as "A stone-built village,  situated on the slope of the hill, containing about 150 Moslems; extensive olive-groves to the south; water from springs and cisterns."

British Mandate era
In the 1922 census of Palestine, conducted  by the British Mandate authorities, Mughar wa  Mansura had a total population of 1377. Of these, 265 were Muslim, 676 Druze and  436 Christians. All the Christians were Roman Catholic. In  the 1931 census the population of Al-Mansura, together with nearby  Maghar, was a total of  1733, in 373 inhabited houses. Of  these, 307 were Muslim, 549 Christians, and 877 Druze.

In the   1945 statistics the population of  Al-Mansura, together with nearby Maghar, was 2,140;  90 Muslims, 800 Christians and 1,250 others. They had  55,583 dunams of land  according to an official land and population survey. 7,864 dunams were plantations and irrigable land, 18,352  for cereals, while 55 dunams were built-up (urban) land.

Post 1948

In 1992, the village site was described: "The site is covered with debris and overgrown with cacti, olive trees and tall grass. Remains of walls are visible, with one door made of stone with an arched door. Another wall is perforated with its interior bars exposed, signs of having been blasted with dynamite."

References

Bibliography

External links
 Welcome To al-Mansura
al-Mansura (Tiberias), Zochrot
Survey of Western Palestine, Map 6:     IAA, SWP Wikimedia commons 

Arab villages depopulated during the 1948 Arab–Israeli War
District of Tiberias